Zarkuiyeh or Zarkooeyeh may refer to:
 Zarkuiyeh, Kerman
 Zarkuiyeh, Yazd